Osmania College Ground is a sports venue located in Kurnool, Andhra Pradesh. The ground also has reasonable sports facilities in the form a football/cricket ground, an outdoor basketball court with lighting facility, a tennis court, volleyball court and a Table Tennis room.  The ground has hosted aRanji Trophy match in 1972 when Andhra cricket team played against Kerala cricket team as match ended in a drawn. The ground is owned and managed by Osmania College.

References

External links 

 cricketarchive
 cricinfo
 Wikimapia
 

Cricket grounds in Andhra Pradesh
Sports venues in Andhra Pradesh
Multi-purpose stadiums in India
Kurnool
Buildings and structures in Kurnool district
Year of establishment missing